Brittany "Britt" Benn (born April 23, 1989) is a Canadian rugby union player. She represented  at the 2014 Women's Rugby World Cup.

Career
Benn won a gold medal at the 2015 Pan American Games as a member of the Canadian women's rugby sevens team.

In 2016, she was named to Canada's first ever women's rugby sevens Olympic team that went on to win the bronze medal for Canada.

In June 2021, Benn was named to Canada's 2020 Summer Olympics team. She is openly lesbian.

Honours and achievements 

 2017, Canada Sevens Langford dream team
 2019, Canada Sevens Langford performance tracker player of the round
2019, Rugby Canada Player of the Year (7s)

References

External links
 
 
 

1989 births
Living people
Canadian female rugby union players
Canada women's international rugby union players
Rugby sevens players at the 2015 Pan American Games
Pan American Games gold medalists for Canada
Rugby sevens players at the 2016 Summer Olympics
Olympic rugby sevens players of Canada
Canada international rugby sevens players
Female rugby sevens players
Sportspeople from Belleville, Ontario
Olympic bronze medalists for Canada
Olympic medalists in rugby sevens
Medalists at the 2016 Summer Olympics
Pan American Games medalists in rugby sevens
Medalists at the 2015 Pan American Games
Rugby sevens players at the 2020 Summer Olympics
Canadian LGBT sportspeople
21st-century Canadian LGBT people
Canada international women's rugby sevens players